Parliamentary elections were held in Poland on 25 September 2005. Thirty million voters were eligible to vote for all 460 members of the lower house, the Sejm and all 100 members of the upper house, the Senate.

The election resulted in a sweeping victory for two opposition parties: the right-wing, national-conservative Law and Justice (PiS) and the centre-right, liberal-conservative Civic Platform (PO). The incumbent centre-left government of the Democratic Left Alliance (SLD) was soundly defeated. PiS won 155 seats and PO 133, while the governing SLD was reduced to fourth place with 55 seats, behind Andrzej Lepper's Self-Defence party, which won 56 seats.

Normally, this would have made PiS leader Jarosław Kaczyński Prime Minister. However, he declined the post so as not to prejudice his twin brother Lech's chances for the presidential election held later in October. In his place, Law and Justice nominated Kazimierz Marcinkiewicz for the post. Outgoing Prime Minister Marek Belka failed to win a seat in Łódź.

In the Senate, PiS won 49 seats and PO 34 of the 100 seats, leaving eight other parties with the remaining 17 seats. The SLD won no seats in the Senate.

Background
The 2005 Sejm was elected by proportional representation from multi-member constituencies, with seats divided among parties which gain more than five percent of the votes using the d'Hondt method. On the other hand, the Senate is elected under first-past-the-post bloc voting. This tends to cause the party or coalition which wins the elections to have a larger majority in the Senate than in the Sejm.

In the 2001 elections the SLD and UP won 216 of the 460 seats, and were able to form a government with the support of the Polish People's Party (PSL). The former ruling party, Solidarity Electoral Action (AWS) based on the Solidarity trade union, lost all its seats. In its place several new right-wing parties emerged, such as the PO and the PiS.

After 2003 a variety of factors combined to bring about a collapse of support for the government. Discontent with high unemployment, government spending cuts (especially on health, education and welfare), affairs related to privatizations was compounded by a series of corruption scandals, the most serious of them being Rywin-gate. Prime Minister Leszek Miller resigned in May 2004 and was succeeded by Marek Belka. All opinion polls suggested that the governing SLD-UP coalition would be heavily defeated at these elections and that the right-wing parties would win a large majority. With the expected downfall of the post-communists, the right-wing parties competed mainly against each other.

Contestants
The parties running in this election were mainly the same as in 2001, with the addition of Social Democracy of Poland (a splinter group from the Democratic Left Alliance), and the Democratic Party formed from the Freedom Union (UW) and some SLD dissidents. Both these new parties failed to win seats.

The BBC commented on election day: "The two centre-right parties are both rooted in the anti-communist Solidarity movement but differ on issues such as the budget and taxation. Law and Justice, whose agenda includes tax breaks and state aid for the poor, has pledged to uphold traditional family and Christian values. It is suspicious of economic liberalism. The Citizens Platform strongly promotes free market forces and wants to introduce a flat 15% rate for income tax, corporation tax and VAT. It also promises to move faster on deregulation and privatisation, in order to adopt the euro as soon as possible."

Opinion polls

Results

Had the two leading parties been able to form a coalition as expected, it would have had 63 percent of seats in the Assembly, just short of the two-thirds supermajority required to carry out constitutional reform. The populist and isolationist Self-Defense of the Polish Republic (Samoobrona) slightly improved its representation and became the third largest party ahead of the SLD, which despite losing most of its seats performed slightly better than expected based on opinion polls. However, the party lost all its Senate seats. The League of Polish Families and the Polish People's Party retained their representation. The German minority in Poland is exempt from the requirement of achieving at least 5% of the total vote and retained their two seats.

Sejm

By constituency
Although PiS and PO were the clear winners, their vote was very unevenly distributed, being overwhelmingly concentrated in the cities, particularly Warsaw and the southern industrial areas around Kraków and Katowice, but also including Gdańsk, Gdynia, Poznań, Wrocław and Szczecin. The only urban centre not to endorse the right was Łódź. The two main parties failed to win a majority in any rural district except Rzeszów in the south. In seven rural districts they polled less the 40 percent of the vote, while in one (Chełm) they polled less than 35 percent. Self-Defence managed to win in four districts. The vote shows the continuing sharp divide in Polish politics between urban voters, who are generally more socially liberal and in favour of free-market economics, and rural voters, who are more socially conservative and economically left-wing.

Seat distribution by constituency

Senate

Aftermath
Negotiations between PiS and PO about forming a government collapsed in late October, precipitated by disagreement regarding who would be speaker of the Sejm. On 1 November PiS announced a minority government headed by Kazimierz Marcinkiewicz as Prime Minister.  The negotiations were affected by the 9 October presidential election where the PiS candidate Lech Kaczyński (the twin brother of PiS leader Jarosław Kaczyński) was elected; Jarosław Kaczyński had promised that he would not become the Prime Minister if his brother wins the election. The constitutional requirement to form a government within a set time period also heated up the coalition negotiations.

A major stumbling block in PiS-PO government negotiations was the latter's insistence on receiving the Interior portfolio, as to prevent one party from controlling all three of the "power" ministries (Security, Justice and Interior) that manage police and security services. The PO also opposed a "tactical alliance" between the PiS and the Self-Defense (Samoobrona) party, which shared eurosceptic and populist sentiments, although differing on economic policy.  The election campaign, in which PiS and PO mainly competed against each other rather than parties to their left, accentuated differences and created an antagonistic relationship between the two parties.

The PiS minority government depended on the support of the radical Samoobrona party and the hard-right League of Polish Families (LPR) to govern, a situation that made many of those hoping for a PiS-PO coalition uneasy. On 5 May 2006 PiS formed a coalition government with Samoobrona and LPR.

In July 2006, Marcinkiewicz tendered his resignation following reports of a rift with PiS party leader Kaczyński.  Kaczyński formed a new government and was sworn-in on 14 July as prime minister.

The SLD's severe defeat sent the party into a sharp decline from which it has never fully recovered; it lost all of its remaining seats in 2015 though it regained some ground in 2019 as part of Lewica.

The 2005 election proved to be a realigning election in polish politics, as Law and Justice and Civic Platform (and presidential candidates by them) have finished in top two of every election since.

Further reading

References

External links

Poland's elections 2005: Full Coverage Axis Globe
Brief Information About the Participants Axis Globe
Elections 2005 Polish National Electoral Commission
The Polish lifeboat Analysis from Adam Szostkiewicz
Return of the right The Economist, 28 September 2005
Minority government for Poles after coalition talks collapse Financial Times, 1 November 2005

Parliamentary elections in Poland
Polish parliamentary election
Parliamentary election
History of Poland (1989–present)
September 2005 events in Europe